Wanneroo is a suburb of Perth, Western Australia, located within the City of Wanneroo.

Wanneroo may also refer to:

 City of Wanneroo, a local government area in the north of Perth, Western Australia
 Wanneroo Road, an arterial road north of Perth
 Wanneroo Raceway, a motor racing circuit

See also